Gary Young (born 2 April 1958) is a former Australian rules footballer who played with Essendon in the Victorian Football League (VFL). He was recruited from East Keilor in the Essendon District Football League and began playing for Essendon's under-19s in 1974.

Sources
Holmesby, Russell & Main, Jim (2009). The Encyclopedia of AFL Footballers. 8th ed. Melbourne: Bas Publishing.

Essendon Football Club profile

Australian rules footballers from Victoria (Australia)
Essendon Football Club players
1958 births
Living people